Phyl & Mikhy is an American sitcom on CBS that aired six episodes during the summer of 1980.

Premise
The premise of the show was a Cold War romance, where, Phyl (Murphy Cross), a 19-year old track star, falls for Mikhy (Rick Lohman), 22 year old Russian decathlete.  CBS gave it a six-week test run starting in May 1980.Shales, Tom (26 May 1980) Advance Payment, The Washington Post

Phyl is a great athlete, but not a cook, and can only make toast.  To save money, the couple move in with Phyl's father Max.  Mikhy is unfamiliar with American culture and technology, which actress Murphy Cross has suggested made the show a type of precursor to Perfect Strangers.  Character Vladimir Gimenko keeps trying to get Mikhy to return to Russia.(22 June 1980). 2 Likable Stars in 'Sitcom', Indianapolis Star ("The show offers little that is new or exciting for viewers but as TV sitcoms go, it is pleasant enough, bolstered by the presence of two likable young performers.")Crosby, Joan (6 July 1980). Phyl became a blonde during hiatus of series, Daily Oklahoman

History
According to director Hal Cooper, the show was a very successful summer replacement, but was cut after six episodes, due to the controversy surrounding the 1980 Summer Olympics boycott.  The United States withdrew from the Olympics, and Cooper thought the network did not want a show with a Russian star, so CBS executive Robert A. Daly cancelled it.

The show originally been intended to run as complementary to the upcoming Olympics, and to have debuted in January 1980.  Lohman got the Russian athlete role (which CBS was finding hard to cast) because Marge Glucksman in casting at CBS had seen his audition for Trapper John, M.D., and Lohman was able to do the accent because he had many Ukrainian and Russian relatives.  According to Lohman, CBS executive William S. Paley loved the show, and intended to use it as a possible replacement for The Jeffersons, but the Olympic boycott delayed the show's debut.Leszczak, Bob. Single Season Sitcoms of the 1980s: A Complete Guide, pp. 127-28 (2016)  Murphy Cross was brought to the show by Linda Otto, who had been casting director on the 1979 TV movie Torn Between Two Lovers in which Cross had appeared.

The show was recorded in front of a live audience at KTTV studios in Los Angeles.  The pilot was made in March 1979, well before the political issues that led to the boycott.  The remaining five episodes were shot about six months later.

Primary cast
Rick Lohman as Mikhail 'Mikhy' Orlov
Murphy Cross as Phyllis 'Phyl' Wilson
Larry Haines as Max Wilson
Michael Pataki as Vladimir Gimenko
Jack Dodson as Edgar 'Truck' Morley

Episodes

References

External links
 

1980 American television series debuts
1980 American television series endings
1980s American sitcoms
CBS original programming
English-language television shows